Ola Viker (1897–1972) was a Norwegian novelist and lawyer.

Viker was born in Fluberg, Oppland.  He made his literary debut in 1951 with the novel Gullskoen. He was awarded the Gyldendal's Endowment in 1963.

References

1897 births
1972 deaths
People from Søndre Land
20th-century Norwegian novelists